Anders Bardal (born 24 August 1982) is a Norwegian former ski jumper.

Career
He participated in the 2002 Winter Olympics in Salt Lake City, finishing 25th on the individual large hill. He was also part of the Norwegian team that finished ninth on the team large hill at those same games. Bardal won his first individual Ski jumping World Cup event in Zakopane on 27 January 2008.

He won four silver medals in the team large hill event at the Ski Jumping World Championships (2007, 2009, and two medals on both normal and large hills in 2011). At the 2008 Ski Flying World Championships in Oberstdorf, he won a bronze in the team event, and in 2010, in the team event as well, he achieved a silver. Same year, he was part of the Norwegian team that won bronze in the team large hill at the 2010 Winter Olympics in Vancouver.

In 2012 he won the overall World Cup, becoming the first Norwegian to win it since Espen Bredesen in 1993/94. A year later, at the 2013 Ski Jumping World Championships in Val di Fiemme, he won a gold medal on the normal hill.

At the 2014 Winter Olympics in Sochi, he won a bronze in the individual normal hill event. He currently lives in Trondheim with his wife, and their daughter and son. He studies at Trondheim Business School. Bardal retired from ski jumping at the end of the 2014/15 season.

World Cup

Standings

Wins

References

1982 births
Living people
People from Steinkjer
Norwegian male ski jumpers
Olympic ski jumpers of Norway
Ski jumpers at the 2002 Winter Olympics
Ski jumpers at the 2010 Winter Olympics
Ski jumpers at the 2014 Winter Olympics
Olympic bronze medalists for Norway
Olympic medalists in ski jumping
FIS Nordic World Ski Championships medalists in ski jumping
Medalists at the 2010 Winter Olympics
Medalists at the 2014 Winter Olympics
Holmenkollen medalists
Sportspeople from Trøndelag
21st-century Norwegian people